Jolls is a surname. Notable people with the surname include:

 Christine Jolls (born 1967), British Gordon Bradford Tweedy Professor of Law 
 Tom Jolls (born 1933), American television personality

See also
Joll